Phenanthrenedione is a quinone derivative of a polycyclic aromatic hydrocarbon.  It is an orange, water-insoluble solid.

Laboratory synthesis and use
It has been prepared by oxidation of phenanthrene with chromic acid.

It is used as a artificial mediator for electron acceptor/donor in Mo/W containing formate dehydrogenase reduction of Carbon dioxide to formate and vice versa. It is a better electron acceptor than the natural Nicodinamide adenosine dinucleotide(NAD+).

Safety
It is a cytotoxic.

References

Quinones
Phenanthrenes